Charles Morgan Robinson Morgan, 1st Baron Tredegar (10 April 1792 – 16 April 1875), was a Welsh Whig peer and a member of the House of Lords.

He was the son of Lt.-Col. Sir Charles Morgan, 2nd Baronet, and his wife, the former Mary Margaret Stoney, and was educated at Harrow School, Westminster School and Christ Church, Oxford (1811).

He was first elected Member of Parliament (MP) for Brecon in 1812 and was re-elected in 1830 and 1835.

He served in the Glamorgan Yeomanry and later in the militia (the Royal Glamorgan Light Infantry, commissioned as Major on 3 April 1849), and was appointed High Sheriff of Monmouthshire for 1821–22 and  High Sheriff of Brecknockshire for 1850–51. He was created Baron Tredegar, of Tredegar in the County of Monmouth on 16 April 1859 and was Lord Lieutenant of Brecknockshire from 1866 until his death.

He died in April 1875. He had married Rosamund, the daughter of Major-General Godfrey Basil Mundy, in late 1827 and had five sons and six daughters. He was succeeded by his son Godfrey Morgan, 1st Viscount Tredegar.

References

1792 births
1875 deaths
People educated at Harrow School
People educated at Westminster School, London
Alumni of Christ Church, Oxford
Barons in the Peerage of the United Kingdom
High Sheriffs of Monmouthshire
High Sheriffs of Brecknockshire
Lord-Lieutenants of Brecknockshire
Glamorgan Yeomanry officers
Glamorgan Militia officers
Morgan, Charles
Morgan, Charles
Morgan, Charles
Morgan, Charles
Morgan, Charles
Morgan, Charles, 2nd Baronet
UK MPs who were granted peerages
Whig (British political party) MPs for Welsh constituencies
Peers of the United Kingdom created by Queen Victoria